Pascal Tosi is a French director, writer and editor born in Lima, Peru.  In 2004, he wrote and directed Photomateurs (Photograbber) which generated a lot of praise and 5 film festival awards.

Filmography

Director
 1996-01: DKTV - La planète de Donkey Kong
 2001-02: MNK - Les Minikeums
 2004: Photograbber - Short film (35 mm)
 2007: Grandeur Nature - TV show

Writer
 2004: Photograbber - Short film

Editor
 1995: Variations - CGI short film by French director Daniel Borenstein
 2006: Renaissance - animated film by French director Christian Volckman
Feature Film Award at the Annecy International Animated Film Festival (2006)
Silver Melies award at the Fantasporto (2007)
Qualified to compete in the best animated feature film category at the 79th Academy awards

References

External links
 Official Pascal Tosi Web site
 Pascal Tosi at the Internet Movie Database
 UniFrance Web site
 Pascal Tosi at the DvdToile Web site
 Photograbber review by Philip Novak
 Photograbber review by Spooky Dan
 Renaissance Official US Web Site

French film editors
Living people
Year of birth missing (living people)